Saint George Parish or Saint George's Parish may refer to:

Saint George Parish, Antigua and Barbuda, a parish of Antigua and Barbuda
Saint George Parish, Barbados, a parish of Barbados
St. George's Parish, Bermuda, a parish of Bermuda
St. George Parish, Cumberland, a parish in New South Wales, Australia
Saint George Parish, Dominica, a parish of Dominica
Saint George Parish, Grenada, a parish of Grenada
Saint Georges Parish, Montserrat, a parish of Montserrat
St. George's Parish, Prince Edward Island, a parish in Prince Edward Island, Canada
Saint George Parish, New Brunswick, a parish in New Brunswick, Canada
St George's Church (Ottawa), a parish in Ottawa, Canada
Saint George Parish, Saint Vincent and the Grenadines, a parish of Saint Vincent and the Grenadines
The colonial name for Burke County, Georgia
Saint George Parish (Bridgeport, Connecticut), United States

See also
Saint George (disambiguation)